NTSF may refer to:
 NTSF:SD:SUV::, a quarter-hour television comedy on Adult Swim;
 A misspelling of Microsoft's NTFS file system